Fik or FIK may refer to:
 Festivali i Këngës
 International Kendo Federation
 Maxipes Fik, a Czech cartoon character